SMA Negeri 1 Yogyakarta is a public government high school in Special Region of Yogyakarta, Indonesia. Its located in H.O.S. Cokroaminoto street, no. 10, Yogyakarta, Special Region of Yogyakarta.

Reference 

Schools in Indonesia
Education in Yogyakarta